Galaxy Invasion is a clone of Namco's Galaxian arcade game written by Big Five Software founders Bill Hogue and Jeff Konyu for the TRS-80 16K and published in 1980. It is the first game from Big Five to include sound and music. Galaxy Invasion was followed by an enhanced version in 1982, Galaxy Invasion Plus, which includes voice.

Gameplay
Galaxy Invasion is a game of defending a lone missile base from alien ships.

Reception
Jon Mishcon reviewed Galaxy Invasion in The Space Gamer No. 35. Johnson commented that "this is one of those very rare state-of-the-art game programs. A wonderful program. A better than wonderful game. Buy it immediately."

Reviews
Moves #57, p14

References

External links
Review in SoftSide
Review in 80 Micro
Review in Byte
Review in Creative Computing

1980 video games
Big Five Software games
Fixed shooters
TRS-80 games
TRS-80-only games
Video game clones
Video games developed in the United States